William John Vukovich II (born March 29, 1944 in Riverside, California) is a former driver in the championship car division of USAC and CART series.

Vukovich was named the 1968 Indianapolis 500 Rookie of the Year, a result of his seventh-place finish. Vukovich raced in the 1965–1982 seasons, with 158 combined career starts, including the Indianapolis 500 in 1968–1977, 1979–1980. He finished in the top ten 85 times, with one victory in 1973 at Michigan. His best finish at the Indianapolis 500 came in 1973, where he finished second in a rain-shortened, tragedy-marred event.

Vukovich also had 23 National midget car victories in his career, and drove for part of his career in J. C. Agajanian's midget car.

Award
He was inducted in the National Midget Auto Racing Hall of Fame in 1998.

Racing family
Bill II is the son of two-time Indianapolis 500 winner Bill Vukovich and the father of Billy Vukovich III, both of whom were killed in racing accidents.

Complete USAC Championship Car results

Complete PPG Indy Car Series results

Indianapolis 500 results

References

1944 births
American people of Serbian descent
American racing drivers
Champ Car drivers
Indianapolis 500 drivers
Indianapolis 500 Rookies of the Year
Living people
Sportspeople from Riverside, California
Racing drivers from California
USAC Silver Crown Series drivers
A. J. Foyt Enterprises drivers